AP-4 complex subunit mu-1 is a protein that in humans is encoded by the AP4M1 gene.

Function 

This gene encodes a subunit of the heterotetrameric AP-4 complex. The encoded protein belongs to the adaptor complexes medium subunits family. This AP-4 complex is involved in the recognition and sorting of cargo proteins with tyrosine-based motifs from the trans-golgi network to the endosomal-lysosomal system.

Interactions 

AP4M1 has been shown to interact with AP4B1.

Clinical relevance 

The AP4-complex-mediated trafficking plays a crucial role in brain development and functioning.

References

External links

Further reading